Fernand Guth (3 May 1926 – 23 August 1977) was a Luxembourgian footballer. He competed in the men's tournament at the 1952 Summer Olympics.

References

External links
 

1926 births
1977 deaths
Luxembourgian footballers
Luxembourg international footballers
Olympic footballers of Luxembourg
Footballers at the 1952 Summer Olympics
Sportspeople from Luxembourg City
Association football midfielders
Union Luxembourg players